Cheungbeia is a genus of sea snails, marine gastropod mollusks in the family Pseudomelatomidae.

Species
Species within the genus Cheungbeia include:
 Cheungbeia kawamurai (Habe & Kosuge, 1966)
 Cheungbeia laterculata (G. B. Sowerby II, 1870)
 Cheungbeia mindanensis (Smith E. A., 1877)
 Cheungbeia robusta (Hinds, 1843)

References
Notes

Bibliography
 Taylor J.D. & Wells F.E. (1994). A revision of the crassispirine gastropods from Hong Kong (Gastropoda: Turridae). In: B. Morton (ed.) The malacofauna of Hong Kong and southern China III . Proceedings of the Third International workshop on the malacofauna of Hong Kong and Southern China. 101-116.

External links
 
 Bouchet, P.; Kantor, Y. I.; Sysoev, A.; Puillandre, N. (2011). A new operational classification of the Conoidea (Gastropoda). Journal of Molluscan Studies. 77(3): 273-308

 
Pseudomelatomidae
Gastropod genera